Volodymyr Petrovych Dykyi (15 February 1962 – 28 July 2021) was a Soviet and Ukrainian professional football player and coach.

References

External links

1962 births
2021 deaths
People from Chervonohrad
Soviet footballers
Ukrainian footballers
Ukrainian expatriate footballers
Association football forwards
FC Karpaty Lviv players
FC Metalist Kharkiv players
FC SKA-Karpaty Lviv players
FC Nyva Ternopil players
FC Naftovyk-Ukrnafta Okhtyrka players
FC Volyn Lutsk players
NK Veres Rivne players
Ukrainian Premier League players
Ukrainian football managers
Sportspeople from Lviv Oblast